A Sister of Six may refer to:
 A Sister of Six (1916 film), an American silent Western film
 A Sister of Six (1926 film), a silent romantic comedy film